Datakhel or Datta Khel is a town in North Waziristan district of Khyber Pakhtunkhwa, Pakistan. 

It is part of Datta Khel Tehsil of North Waziristan district.

Overview and history
Datakhel is located around 41 km South West of near by towns of Miran Shan and 21 km of Boya in North Wizaristan. According to the 2017 census, the population of Datakhel, is 1037 with total number of household stands at 171.

On Sept 25, 2008, as an indication of escalating tensions between nations, Pakistani forces fired warning shots at American aircraft after they crossed into Pakistan's territory in the area of Saidgai, in North Waziristan's Datakhel region.

On March 17, 2011, a US airstrike that killed 44 people in the city led to widespread condemnation in Pakistan.

See also
 North Waziristan
 Khyber Pakhtunkhwa

References

External links

Populated places in North Waziristan